The Oaths Act 1888 (51 & 52 Vict. c.46) was an Act of the Parliament of the United Kingdom providing that all required oaths (including the oath of allegiance taken to the Sovereign, required in order to sit in Parliament) may be solemnly affirmed rather than sworn to God. The Act was the culmination of a campaign by the noted atheist and secularist MP Charles Bradlaugh to take his seat.

The Act was consolidated and repealed by the Oaths Act 1978.

See also
Oaths Act

References

External links
Hansard, Second Reading of the Oaths Bill, 14 March 1888
Hansard, Third Reading of the Oaths Bill, 9 August 1888

Anti-discrimination legislation
Anti-discrimination law in the United Kingdom
United Kingdom Acts of Parliament 1888
Oaths of allegiance